Lenin El-Ramly (August 18, 1945 – February 7, 2020) was an independent Egyptian writer and director of films and for television and theater. His work is in the field of satire, farce, parody and the Theatre of the Absurd.

He was recognized in Egypt and abroad for his daring to put question marks at hypocrite and intolerant manners in parts of the Egyptian society and other countries in the Arab world. His presentations were characterized as  existentialist and sociopolitical questions within popular funny settings.

Life and career 
El-Ramly was born in August 1945 in Cairo to a politically engaged family. His mother is Souad Zuhair. He published his first short story in 1956 in the magazine Sabah El-Kheir. Yet during his study, in 1967, he started writing social comedies and series for television. At the beginning of the 21st Century, his work from this era is still broadcast. In 1970 he obtained his bachelor's degree in Theater Critics and Theater Literature at the High Institute for Theater Art.<ref name="GoldenThreadLER">Golden Thread, [http://www.goldenthread.org/oldsite/content/past_prod_reo_05.html 'Lenin El Ramly - Nightmare'''] </ref>

In 1971 El-Ramly and film director Salah Abu Seif began a close co-operation. In this time he wrote The Ostrich and the Peacock, which in 2002, for the first time since 30 years, could be shown to the public. The censors say that this film starts a sexual dialogue that invokes sexual desires. According to El-Ramly they had misunderstood his script.Daily Times (6 May 2006) Egyptian film breaks taboos by discussing sex

El-Ramly founded his own theater company in 1980, called Studio 80. His aim has been to put another kind of plays on stage than usually could be seen at commercial plays. His work Bel-Arabi El-Faseeh of 1991, that has been translated into English as In Plain Arabic, labors at Pan-Arabism. This play has been described as matchless satire, and was declared to be the Best Theater Play of the Year in Egypt. From Kuwait he received the Soad Sabbah Award for this play. From Western media he received praising critics as well, for instance in the Herald Tribune and Time Magazine. His theater plays have been staged in the Arab world, as well as in Western countries like France and Australia. Although In plain Arabic has been refused during the Carthage Theatre Festival in Tunisia.

In 1993, El-Ramly founded his second theater company, called Studio 2000. In 1994, he rewrote his debut from 1967 that he had introduced then under the title Al-Erhabi (The Terrorist). With this scenario he got widely known in his own country and abroad.

El-Ramly's work is widely recognized. For instance he won during the Vivay Film Festival for Comical Movies in 1987, and received the Kuwaiti en Soad Sabbah Award in 1991. In 2005 El-Ramly was honored with the Prince Claus Award from the Netherlands. The jury valued his "constructive use of humour to provoke public analysis of social and cultural issues."

 Theater plays  
Until 2005, El-Ramly wrote forty theater plays in Arabic that have been shown on the stage. Three of them were translated into English:

 1994: In Plain Arabic, A U C in Cairo Press, Egypt, translated by Esmat Allouba, 
 1999: Point of view, Foreign Cultural Information Dept., Egypt, translated by Yussif Hifnawi, 
 1999: The Nightmare, City University Of N.Y, USA, translated by Wagdi Zeid

More plays have been translated in other languages, like The Prisoner from 2002 which was staged in Danish.

 Filmography 
The following film scripts have been written by El-Ramly:
 1983: A Marriage Proposal, Nagy Anglo
 1985: The Man Who Sneezed, Omr Abd El Aziz
 1986: Ali Bey and the 40 Thieves, Ahmed yassen
 1986: The Beginning, Omr Abd El Aziz
 1987: The Intern Lawyer, Salah Abou Seif
 1994: Mr. Dog, Salah Abou Seif
 1994: The Terrorist, Nader Galal
 1995: Bekeet and Adeela, Nader Galal
 1997: Bekeet and Adeela, Nader Galal
2000: Hello America, Nader Galal
2002: The Ostrich and The Peacock'', Mohammed Abou Seif

References 

1945 births
2020 deaths
Egyptian dramatists and playwrights
Egyptian film directors
Egyptian screenwriters
Egyptian television directors
Egyptian theatre directors
Existentialists
Mass media people from Cairo
Theatre of the Absurd